Kyupchal may refer to:
Küçeyi, Azerbaijan
Küpçal, Azerbaijan